Johan Fagrell (born 16 June 1967) is a Swedish former cyclist. He competed in the team time trial at the 1992 Summer Olympics.

References

External links
 

1967 births
Living people
Swedish male cyclists
Olympic cyclists of Sweden
Cyclists at the 1992 Summer Olympics
People from Motala Municipality
Sportspeople from Östergötland County